The 1932 United States presidential election in Arizona took place on November 8, 1932, as part of the 1932 United States presidential election. State voters chose three representatives, or electors, to the Electoral College, who voted for president and vice president.

Arizona was won by Governor of New York Franklin D. Roosevelt (D–New York), running with Speaker of the House John Nance Garner, with 67.03% of the popular vote, against incumbent President Herbert Hoover (R–California), running with incumbent Vice President Charles Curtis, with 30.53% of the popular vote.

This was the last time until 2020 that a non-incumbent Democrat would carry Arizona in a presidential election.

Results

Results by county

Notes

References

Arizona
1932
1932 Arizona elections